David Smith may refer to:

Academics
 David Paige Smith (1830–1880), American medical doctor and professor at Yale
 David Eugene Smith (1860–1944), American professor of mathematics
 D. M. Smith (1884–1962), American professor of mathematics at Georgia Tech
 D. Nichol Smith (1875–1962), Scottish professor of literature at Oxford University
 David Chadwick Smith (1931–2000), Canadian professor of economics, Queen's University
 David C. Smith (historian) (1929–2009), American professor of history, University of Maine
 David Martyn Smith (1921–2009), American professor of forestry at Yale
 David Smith (botanist) (1930–2018), British professor of botany
 Dai Smith (academic) (born 1945), Welsh professor of history
 David J. Smith (physicist) (born 1948), Australian professor of physics at Arizona State
 David Livingstone Smith (born 1953), professor of philosophy at the University of New England
 David Smith (historian) (born 1963), British professor of history at Cambridge
 David K. Smith, British professor of chemistry at University of York
 David R. Smith (physicist), American physicist and professor of electrical and computer engineering at Duke University

Arts and entertainment

 David Forbes Smith (1865–1923), Scottish architect
 David Smith (director) (1872–1930), English film director of the silent era
 David Stanley Smith (composer) (1877–1949), American classical composer, professor of music at Yale
 David Smith (sculptor) (1906–1965), American Abstract Expressionist
 David C. Smith (author) (born 1952), American novelist of heroic fantasy
 David Smith, Australian artist, founding member of the art collective Optronic Kinetics in 1970s Sydney
 David G Smith, American singer-songwriter from the 1970s to the present
 David Bruce Smith (born 1958), American publisher, real estate executive
 David Alan Smith (actor) (born 1959), American actor and writer
 David Lee Smith (born 1963), American film actor
 David A. Smith (designer) (born 1968), British designer, glass embosser, sign writer
 David B. Smith (born 1977), American multi-disciplinary artist
 David Brian Smith (born 1981), English artist
 David Branson Smith (born 1984), American film screenwriter
 David Smith (reality TV star), participant in The Next Joe Millionaire (2003)
 David P. Smith, American animator and voice actor, creator of Mixels (2014–2016)

Computing

 David Canfield Smith (born 1945),  American computer scientist who invented graphical interface icons
 David A. Smith (computer scientist) (born 1957), American computer scientist and entrepreneur
 David L. Smith (hacker) (born ), author of the Melissa virus

Medicine
 David Boyes Smith (1833–1889), deputy surgeon general of the Indian Medical Service
 David M. Smith (virologist) (born 1971), American translational research virologist
 David Weyhe Smith (1926–1981), American pediatrician and dysmorphologist
 David E. Smith (born 1939), American doctor specializing in addiction medicine

Journalism
 David D. Smith (born 1950), American president and CEO of Sinclair Broadcast Group
 David Andrew Smith (born 1952), British journalist
 David Smith (journalist and author) (born 1954), economics editor of the UK Sunday Times
 David Smith (journalist) (born 1975), Washington, DC, Bureau Chief of the UK The Guardian

Politics and law

Australia
 David Smith (Victorian politician) (1861–1943), Australian politician
 David Smith (public servant) (1933–2022), Official Secretary to five Governors-General of Australia
 David Smith (Australian Capital Territory politician) (born 1970), Australian politician
 David Smith (Western Australian politician) (born 1943), Australian politician

Canada
 Sir David William Smith, 1st Baronet (1764–1837), Canadian soldier and politician
 David William Smith (born 1938), Ontario politician
 David Smith (Canadian senator) (1941–2020), Canadian lawyer and politician
 David Smith (Quebec politician) (born 1963), Canadian politician
 David Smith (justice), Canadian judge
 David Smith (Toronto politician), Ontario politician
 Dave Smith (Peterborough, Ontario politician), Ontario politician

United States
 David Highbaugh Smith (1854–1928), American congressman
 David S. Smith (1918–2012), U.S. ambassador to Sweden
 D. Brooks Smith (born 1951), American federal judge
 Adam Smith (Washington politician) (David Adam Smith, born 1965), American congressman
 David Brock Smith, member of the Oregon House of Representatives
 David Smith (Florida politician) (born 1960), member of the Florida Legislature
 David Smith (Oklahoma politician), member of the Oklahoma House of Representatives
 David Burnell Smith (1941–2014), member of the Arizona House of Representatives
 David Tyson Smith, member of the Missouri House of Representatives

Other countries
 David Smith (English politician) (1826–1886), British MP
 David Smith (judge) (1888–1982), New Zealand judge
 David Smith (Rhodesian politician) (1922–1996), politician in Rhodesia and Zimbabwe
 David Smith (spy), Berlin British Embassy security guard accused of spying for Russia

Religion
 David Hyrum Smith (1844–1904), missionary of the Latter Day Saint movement
 David A. Smith (Mormon) (1879–1952), bishop and first president of the Mormon Tabernacle Choir
 David Smith (bishop) (born 1935), English Bishop of Bradford

Sports

Cricket
 David Smith (Gloucestershire cricketer) (1934–2003), English cricketer, 1956–1971
 David Smith (Derbyshire cricketer) (1940–2021), English cricketer
 David Smith (cricketer, born 1945), English cricketer
 David Smith (cricketer, born 1956), English cricketer
 David Anthony Smith (born 1957), Australian cricketer for the Tasmanian Tigers
 David Smith (Sussex cricketer, born 1962), English cricketer
 David Smith (Warwickshire cricketer, born 1956), English cricketer
 David Smith (Warwickshire cricketer, born 1962), English cricketer
 David Smith (cricketer, born 1970), English cricketer
 David Smith (cricketer, born 1989), English cricketer

Footballers
 David Smith (sportsman) (1884–1963), Australian rules footballer, 1903–1914
 David Smith (footballer, born 1871), English professional footballer who played between 1890 and 1896
 David Smith (footballer, born 1875) (1875–1947), Scottish footballer
 David Smith (footballer, born 1968), English professional footballer who played between 1986 and 2003
 David Smith (footballer, born 1970), English professional footballer who played between 1989 and 2004
 David Smith (footballer, born 1993), Scottish professional footballer
 Dai Smith (rugby league) (David Smith), rugby league footballer who played in the 1900s for Salford
 David Smith (1970s rugby league) (born 1953), rugby league footballer who played in the 1970s and 1980s
 David Smith (rugby league, born 1968) (born 1968), rugby league footballer who played in the 1980s and 1990s
 David Smith (rugby union, born 1986), Samoan rugby union footballer for Hurricanes, Blues, Auckland
 David Smith (rugby union, born 1988), English rugby union footballer
 David Smith (rugby union, born 1957), South African rugby union footballer

Track and field
 Dave Smith (triple jumper) (born 1947), American triple jumper
 David Smith (hammer thrower, born 1962), English Olympic hammer thrower
 David Smith (hammer thrower, born 1974), English Olympic hammer thrower
 David Adley Smith II (born 1992), Puerto Rican high jumper
 David Smith (British high jumper) (born 1991), British high jumper and competitor at the 2018 Commonwealth Games

Other sports
 David Smith (sport shooter) (1880–1945), South African Olympic sport shooter
 David Smith (sailor) (1925–2014), American sailor and Olympic Champion
 Davey Boy Smith (1962–2002), British professional wrestler a.k.a. "The British Bulldog"
 David Miln Smith (born 1938), American adventure athlete and speaker
 David Smith (baseball historian) (born 1948), American baseball historian, statistician, professor of biology
 David Smith (racewalker) (born 1955), Australian Olympic race walker
 David Ross Smith, ice hockey defenceman
 Dave Smith (ice hockey) (born 1968), Canadian coach, former player, IHL
 David Smith (rower) (born 1978), British adaptive rower
 Davey Boy Smith Jr. (born 1985), Canadian professional wrestler, a.k.a. Harry Francis Smith
 David Smith (volleyball) (born 1985), American volleyball player
 David Smith (canoeist) (born 1987), Australian sprint canoeist
 David Smith (boccia) (born 1989), British Paralympic boccia player
 David Smith (curler), Scottish curler, first international competition was 1982
 David Smith (fighter), American mixed martial arts fighter

Other people
 David John Smith (1907–1976), president of British retailer W. H. Smith, 1948–1968
 David M. Smith (Medal of Honor) (1926–1950), American soldier and Medal of Honor recipient
 David Smith (chef) (born 1982), Australian chef
 David Smith (executive), Welsh banking and sporting administrator
 David Smith (murderer) (born 1956), English rapist and murderer
 David R. Smith (general) (born 1942), United States Air Force general
 David J. Smith (author), Canadian teacher and educational consultant, children's writer
 David Smith, co-founder and of Media Molecule

See also
 Dave Smith (disambiguation)